The Route of Megalithic Culture was first created as a tourist route that meanders from Osnabrück to Oldenburg in North-West Germany.  Signposted with brown road signs it links many places of archaeological interest from the Megalithic era.

Signs for the route started going up in 2008 and 2009. The whole 310-kilometre-long route was officially opened on 14 May 2009.

The route links many sites of archaeological investigation and 33 stations where the public can visit archaeological sites, for example, with standing stones.

On the 27th of August 2013, the route became part of the Cultural Route of the Council of Europe initiative, with sections in a growing number of countries, including Denmark, England, Netherlands, Portugal, and Sweden.

Route 
The founding section of the Route of Megalithic Culture runs through the territories of Osnabrück, Ostercappeln, Belm-Vehrte, Wallenhorst, Bramsche, Ankum, Berge, Bippen, Fürstenau, Freren, Thuine, Lingen (Ems), Meppen, Sögel, Werlte, Lastrup, Cloppenburg, Visbek, Großenkneten, Wildeshausen, Dötlingen, Ganderkesee and Oldenburg.

It is planned to extend the route, on the one side towards North Rhine-Westphalia, and on the other towards northeast Lower Saxony as far as Schleswig-Holstein. The original route in Lower Saxony now forms part of a greater EU initiative with similar routes in Denmark, England, Netherlands, Portugal, and Sweden. In the Netherlands, for instance, there are another 53  megalithic sites.

Purpose 
The Route of Megalithic Culture is intended to give a better understanding of the lives of people who lived over 5,000 years ago in all its member countries. The founding part of the route in northwest Germany has 33 stations, with insights into the function and design of their graves, their conception of the afterlife, understanding of nature and everyday lives. In some cases, the holiday road also leads to groups of Bronze Age and Iron Age tumuli of more recent times.

The flyer for the Route of Megalithic Culture not only shows the numerous stone age stations of megalithic culture, but also other sights and points of interest along the way. These include sights especially around the town of Osnabrück with its Cultural History Museum, the castles and palaces in Osnabrück Land, the Venne Iron Age House, the Old St Alexander's Church, the Kalkriese Museum and Park, the Cloth Maker's Museum, Bramsche, Malgarten Abbey, Börstel Abbey, the town of Meppen, the Hüven Mill, Clemenswerth Palace, the Cloppenburg Museum Village, St. Alexander's Church, the village of Dötlingen, Hude Abbey and the city of Oldenburg with its State Museum of Nature and People.

Stations
The 33 stations as numbered on the official web site.

Organisation and financing 
The Straße der Megalithkultur is a community project resulting from collaboration between:
 Emsland Touristik GmbH
 Landkreis Vechta
 Museum am Schölerberg Osnabrück - Natur und Umwelt, Planetarium
 
 Oldenburg Tourismus und Marketing GmbH
 Stadt- und Kreisarchäologie Osnabrück
 Tourismusverband Osnabrücker Land e.V.
 Zweckverband Erholungsgebiet 
 Zweckverband Naturpark Wildeshauser Geest

Authorised by the Behörde für Geoinformation, Landentwicklung und Liegenschaften  (Department of Geoinformation, Land Usage and Property), financing for the Route of Megalithic Culture is provided from EU funds, distributed to local tourism and district authorities.

In May 2011, at the request of the tourism office for Osnabrück county (Landkreis) the tourism promotion department of the Ministry for Economic Affairs provided a subsidy of €180,600 for the route.

References

 Ernst Sprockhoff: Atlas der Megalithgräber Deutschland. Teil 3: Niedersachsen – Westfalen. Rudolf Habelt Verlag, Bonn, 1975, S. 129–130.
 Annette Bussmann: Steinzeitzeugen. Reisen zur Urgeschichte Nordwestdeutschlands. Straße der Megalithkultur. Herausgegeben von Arbeitsgemeinschaft Straße der Megalithkultur, Isensee, Oldenburg, 2009, .

M
Megalithic monuments in Germany
Burials in Lower Saxony
Megalith